Epinotia nemorivaga, the bearberry bell, is a species of moth in the family Tortricidae. It is found in Europe (from Fennoscandia and northern Russia to the Iberian Peninsula and Italy, and from Ireland to Poland) and Asia (China: Henan, Sichuan, Guizhou, Shaanxi).

The wingspan is 10–12 mm. The face and palpi are pale brownish. The forewings are silvery- whitish, finely strigulated with fuscous. The costa is posteriorly strigulated with dark fuscous and white. There  are some scattered dark fuscous strigulae . The basal patch with edge somewhat bent, the central fascia with posterior median projection, and an irregular spot touching termen in middle  are all dark fuscous. The termen is hardly sinuate.The cilia have a white subapical dash. The hindwings are grey.The larva is pale yellowish ; head dark brown :

Adults are on wing in June and July in western Europe.

The larvae feed on Arctostaphylos alpinus and Arctostaphylos uva-ursi. The larvae mine the leaves of their host plant. The mine starts as a corridor. Later, the larva leaves the corridor and starts making a large full-depth blotch. The larva leaves the blotch and moves to a new leaf, connecting both leaves with silk. The larvae are a dull grey-green color with a shining black head. They can be found from September to May.

References

Moths described in 1848
Eucosmini